Jacob Abraham is a pair of given names. Notable people with the names include:
 Jacob Abraham de Mist (1749–1823), Dutch statesman
 Jacob ben Abraham Faitusi (died 1812), Tunisian Jewish scholar
 Jacob ben Abraham Kahana (died 1826), rabbinical author

See also
 Jacob Abraham, American computer scientist
 Jacob Abraham (medalist) (1723–1800), German Jewish medalist
 Philippe-Jacques Abraham (1848–1915), Chaldean Catholic bishop